Trustkill Records was an American independent record label that started as a hardcore punk fanzine in April 1993. It started releasing hardcore, metal and rock records and merchandise in 1994. In 2010, the president of Trustkill, Josh Grabelle, formed a new label called Bullet Tooth Records.

Distribution
On January 9, 2007, Trustkill signed a deal for exclusive distribution in North America with Fontana Distribution, which is under the Universal Music Group umbrella. Trustkill is also distributed by SPV (Europe), Shock (Australia), JVC/Howling Bull (Japan), David Gresham (South Africa), and Liberation (Brazil).

In 2009, independent hardcore label Think Fast! Records signed a worldwide distribution deal with Trustkill Records. Later in 2009, No Sleep Records also signed a worldwide distribution deal with Trustkill.

In June 2010, president/A&R Josh Grabelle left Trustkill Records and started a new label called Bullet Tooth Records. The label's distributor still holds the rights to all of the albums released through the label and will still continue to print Trustkill releases and use the Trustkill logo. Since it is unlikely that their distributor will continue to sign new bands and print new releases, Trustkill is considered to be a defunct label. Many of the bands that were signed to the label at this time were re-signed to Bullet Tooth including Memphis May Fire and Most Precious Blood.

In a 2012 interview, Grabelle announced the formation of another record label. Named Gypsey Diamond, it will sign and release music by pop and electronica artists.

In a 2013 interview with SoundCrave Magazine, Grabelle further explained the situation regarding Trustkill's demise:

Controversies

Several bands signed to the label experienced problems, as detailed below. However, some members of bands formerly signed to Trustkill are still friends with label president Josh Grabelle, such as Roses Are Red's Vincent Minervino, Eighteen Visions' James Hart, and This Is Hell's Travis Reilly.

Hopesfall
After their breakup at the beginning of 2008, Hopesfall began releasing negative comments about Trustkill including "I hate Trustkill and its owner. Hahahaha. He's not the reason we broke up but I (we) do hate him." The band claimed to be $20,000 in debt due to Trustkill's President, Josh Grabelle, and also claimed that Trustkill "ripped off the band" by removing songs from their final album Magnetic North without discussing it with the band first. The album was recorded, mastered, and ready to be released when the songs were removed by Trustkill. Hopesfall later released a downloadable file containing b-sides and demos from Magnetic North. In an interview on Ryan's Rock Show, drummer Jason Trabue stated that Grabelle added Hopesfall to Warped Tour in 2005, then two weeks into the tour, Grabelle stopped paying for the bus. The band had to take out a loan to pay the driver and get home. In the same interview, Trabue stated that Grabelle "pretty much owed every band on that label money."

In response to these issues, Grabelle stated that, "[Trabue] does not speak a shred of truth... I heard those guys got into some pretty hardcore drugs... and they are just miserable."

Bleeding Through
In 2007, Bleeding Through suggested to Trustkill that they would like to release a reissue of their 2006 release The Truth but the idea was rejected for various reasons. In 2008, Trustkill reissued The Truth with bonus tracks and a bonus DVD of which the band had no knowledge of. Bleeding Through believes that the reissue is a "fast and overt attempt to pay some bills." Bleeding Through also had issues with Trustkill and their new album Declaration. Trustkill violated the band's contract by letting them enter the studio in March 2008 and only funding less than 25% of the recording costs; the rest was paid via loans from lead singer Brandan Schieppati's father and the band's management. Bleeding Through commented on the current state of the label, "Trustkill no longer employs his sales guy, his art director or his publicist. 'Trustkill' is now Josh and one employee in his basement, as far as we can tell."

Throwdown
Throwdown ended their three-album contract with Trustkill Records in 2007 with their release of Venom and Tears. Nearly a year after the release, the band felt it was necessary to "air out years of dirty laundry with Josh Grabelle of Trustkill Records," or publicly release their feelings about the label. On March 31, 2008, Trustkill breached the band's contract, and as of July 2008 despite sending the label a notice of breach, nothing was resolved. The label owes Throwdown "tens of thousands of dollars in unpaid royalties for CDs sold" and has a history of not paying the band their royalties on time. The band expressed that the start of their contract with Trustkill was "very positive," however numerous issues over the years changed their minds. They had to drop off of several Warped Tour dates in 2006 when Trustkill failed to pay the bus driver on time, and also failed to make payments on time while recording Venom and Tears.

President Josh Grabelle dismissed the band's concerns by continuously saying that Throwdown "was never happy with anything [I] do." The band left the label with hopes that Trustkill could fix itself and stated, "we hope that by making this situation public, Josh will be motivated to get his business in order and set things right with Throwdown and everyone else who has been burned by the increasingly difficult situation."

Memphis May Fire
Memphis May Fire were once signed to Trustkill and later Grabelle's Bullet Tooth. The band's song "The Victim" that appears on 2011's The Hollow talks about "much darker times" during their time signed to Trustkill Records. "The Victim" includes the lines "If I could go back/do it all again/you know that I wouldn't sign my life away". Before introducing the song the band has called Trustkill a "shitty label" and have said that they are now proud to be a part of Rise Records. The lyrics of the song "Prove Me Right", off album, Challenger discuss the band's struggles with the record label retrospectively. "The Rose", from Unconditional, contains similar content.

It Dies Today
In late 2010, Nick Brooks and Mike Hatalak of It Dies Today formed a new group called The March. In a Myspace blog, the band posted lyrics to one of their first demos; a song titled "Harlots, Thieves, & Fakes." In the blog, a lyric line was capitalized as follows: "When TRUST is KILLed you'll only have yourself to blame." The band has not commented on the meaning of the song, but from the rest of the lyrics it can be inferred that they are referring to label president Josh Grabelle.

Terror
Todd Jones, formerly of the hardcore band Terror and currently of the band Nails, blasted label president Josh Grabelle in a 2011 interview, saying "I also regret ever having anything to do with Josh Grabelle; but I know karma is very real and will catch up with him (if it hasn't already)."

Poison the Well
In a 2013 podcast interview, Poison the Well drummer Chris Hornbrook spoke ill of the label and president Josh Grabelle, saying the band went through "dumb shit with that guy" and that he owed the band money.

Walls of Jericho
In a 2013 radio interview, Dustin Schoenhofer of Walls of Jericho claimed that the band had finally severed ties with Trustkill Records, stating that while the label helped the band get established, they "owe us quite a bit of money" and did not fully support the band while engaging in heavy festival touring.

Roster

 Adversary (2008–2010)
 Another Victim
 ArmsBendBack (2003–2010)
 Awaken Demons (2009–2010)
 BEDlight for BlueEYES (2004–2009)
 Bleeding Through (2003–2009)
 Brother's Keeper
 Bullet for My Valentine
 Burn It Down
 Campfire
 Cast Iron Hike
 City Sleeps (2007–2010)
 Crash Romeo (2005–2010)
 Deception of a Ghost (2010)
 Despair
 Disaster of Impulse (2009-2010)
 Disembodied
 Eighteen Visions (1999–2007)
 Endeavor
 Fight Paris
 Fightstar (2007–2010)
 First Blood (2006–2010)
 The Great American Beast (2009–2010)
 The Great Deceiver
 Harvest
 Hopesfall (2002–2007)
 Idle Hands
 It Dies Today (2004–2010)
 Kid Liberty (2009–2010)
 Memphis May Fire (2007–2010)
 Most Precious Blood (2001–2010)
 Nora (1999–2010)
 One Nature
 Open Hand (2002–2010)
 Outbreak (2009–2010)
 Picturesque
 Poison the Well (1999–2003)
 Psycho Enhancer
 Racetraitor
 Roses Are Red (2004–2007)
 SeventyEightDays
 Shai Hulud
 Shenoem
 Sick City (2007–2010)
 Soldiers (2007–2010)
 Spark Lights The Friction
 StoneRider (2007–2010)
 Terror
 This Is Hell (2005–2009)
 Throwdown (2003–2008)
 Too Pure to Die (2007–2009)
 Turmoil
 VentanA (2009–2010)
 Victory in Numbers (2009–2010)
 Walls of Jericho (1999–2009)

See also
List of record labels

References

External links
 (defunct)
Trustkill Records at Discogs
Interview w/ Trustkill President, Josh Grabelle (2002)

Defunct record labels of the United States
Record labels established in 1994
Record labels disestablished in 2010
American independent record labels
Hardcore record labels
Heavy metal record labels
Rock record labels
Trustkill Records